The Suffering or Suffering may refer to:

The Suffering
The Suffering (video game), by Midway Games and Surreal Software
 The Suffering: Ties That Bind, the sequel to the aforementioned game
 The Suffering (song), by Coheed and Cambria
 The Iced Earth song trilogy consisting of the last three tracks from The Dark Saga
 The Suffering (Doctor Who audio), a Doctor Who "Companion Chronicles" audiobook.
The Suffering (2016 film), American horror/thriller film

Suffering
 Suffering, pain in a broad sense
 Dukkha, the Buddhist principle
 "Suffering", a song by Carnifex that is included on their second album The Diseased and the Poisoned
 Jeff Suffering (born Jeff Bettger), U.S. musician.

See also
 Suffer (disambiguation)
 Endurance, sufferance
 Pain and Suffering (disambiguation)
 This Suffering (2007 song), song by Billy Talent